Fort Gomer Halt railway station served the town of Gosport, Hampshire, England from 1894 to 1930 on the Lee-on-the-Solent Railway.

History 
The station opened on 12 May 1894 as Privett Halt by the Lee-on-the-Solent Railway. It was situated on Privett Road on the B3333, which now runs through the site of the station. The name was changed to Fort Gomer Halt in October 1909 to avoid confusion with  station. The station temporarily closed to passengers on 31 August 1914 but reopened on 1 October 1914. It later closed again to passengers and goods traffic on 1 May 1930.

References

External links 

Disused railway stations in Hampshire
Railway stations in Great Britain opened in 1894
Railway stations in Great Britain closed in 1930
1894 establishments in England
1930 disestablishments in England